Davan may refer to:

People
 Davan Maharaj, Trinidadian journalist

Places
 Davan, Fars, Iran
 Davan, Gilan, Iran
 Davan, Hamadan, Iran
 Loch Davan, United Kingdom

Fictional characters
 Davan Shakari
 Davan (Star Wars)
 Powerhouse (Rieg Davan)

See also
 Dawan (disambiguation)